Steffi Graf was the defending champion and won in the final 6–1, 6–3 against Chanda Rubin.

Seeds
A champion seed is indicated in bold text while text in italics indicates the round in which that seed was eliminated. All thirty-two seeds received a bye to the second round.

 Steffi Graf (champion)
 Arantxa Sánchez Vicario (second round)
 Anke Huber (quarterfinals)
 Gabriela Sabatini (quarterfinals)
 Kimiko Date (quarterfinals)
 Chanda Rubin (final)
 Jana Novotná (third round)
 Lindsay Davenport (semifinals)
 Mary Joe Fernández (fourth round)
 Amanda Coetzer (third round)
 Martina Hingis (second round)
 Julie Halard-Decugis (fourth round)
 Zina Garrison-Jackson (second round)
 Nathalie Tauziat (fourth round)
 Helena Suková (third round)
 Irina Spîrlea (quarterfinals)
 Barbara Paulus (third round)
 Judith Wiesner (fourth round)
 Lisa Raymond (third round)
 Naoko Sawamatsu (second round)
 Marianne Werdel-Witmeyer (third round)
 Åsa Carlsson (second round)
 Ai Sugiyama (fourth round)
 Kristie Boogert (third round)
 Petra Begerow (second round)
 Florencia Labat (third round)
 Yone Kamio (second round)
 Silvia Farina (fourth round)
 Elena Likhovtseva (second round)
 Miriam Oremans (third round)
 Sandrine Testud (third round)
 Shi-Ting Wang (third round)

Draw

Finals

Top half

Section 1

Section 2

Section 3

Section 4

Bottom half

Section 5

Section 6

Section 7

Section 8

References
 1996 Lipton Championships Draw

Women's Singles
Singles